Rasberry may refer to:

People with the surname
Gary Rasberry, Canadian folk singer, nominated in Juno Awards of 2014
 Tom Rasberry, American exterminator who identified the Rasberry crazy ant
Vaughn Rasberry, author of Race and the Totalitarian Century, winner of 2017 American Book Award

Other uses
 Rasberry crazy ant, an invasive species of ant found near Houston, Texas, named for Tom Rasberry
Rasberry Lake, a lake in Columbia County, Arkansas, United States

See also
 Raspberry, an edible fruit